Belarus attended the 2008 Summer Olympics in Beijing, China. A team of 181 athletes competed in 28 different sports.

Medalists

Archery

Belarus sent two archers to the Olympics, one in the men's competition and one in the women's.

Athletics

Men
Track & road events

Field events

Combined events – Decathlon

Women
Track & road events

* Competed in the heats only

Field events

Combined events – Heptathlon

* The athlete who finished in second place, Lyudmila Blonska of the Ukraine, tested positive for a banned substance. Both the A and the B tests were positive, therefore Blonska was stripped of her silver medal, and Maksimava moved up a position.

Badminton

Basketball

Women's tournament
Roster

Group play

Quarterfinals

Boxing

Belarus qualified four boxers for the Olympic boxing tournament. Nurudzinau, Magamedau, and Zuyeu each qualified for their weight classes in the first European qualifying event. Khatsigov qualified at the second European qualifying event.

Canoeing

Sprint
Men

Women

Qualification Legend: QS = Qualify to semi-final; QF = Qualify directly to final

Cycling

Road

Track
Sprint

Omnium

Diving

Men

Women

Equestrian

Dressage

Eventing

Fencing 

Men

Gymnastics

Artistic
Men
Team

Individual finals

Women

Rhythmic

Trampoline

Judo 

Men

Modern pentathlon

Rowing 

Men

Women

Qualification Legend: FA=Final A (medal); FB=Final B (non-medal); FC=Final C (non-medal); FD=Final D (non-medal); FE=Final E (non-medal); FF=Final F (non-medal); SA/B=Semifinals A/B; SC/D=Semifinals C/D; SE/F=Semifinals E/F; QF=Quarterfinals; R=Repechage

Sailing 

Men

Women

M = Medal race; EL = Eliminated – did not advance into the medal race; CAN = Race cancelled;

Shooting 

Men

Women

Swimming

Men

Women

Synchronized swimming

Table tennis

Tennis

Weightlifting 

Men

Women

Wrestling 

Men's freestyle

 Murad Gaidarov originally finished third, but in November 2016, he was promoted to second place due to disqualification of Soslan Tigiev.

Men's Greco-Roman

Women's freestyle

References

Nations at the 2008 Summer Olympics
2008
Summer Olympics